Marshal-Admiral Marquis  (1 June 1843 – 18 July 1902) was a Japanese politician and admiral in the Meiji period.

Biography

Early life
Saigō was born in Shimokajiyachō, Kagoshima, the son of the samurai Saigō Kichibe of the Satsuma Domain. His siblings included his famous older brother Saigō Takamori. Saigō changed his name many times throughout his life. Besides the two listed above, he sometimes went by the nickname "Shingō". His real name was either "Ryūkō", or "Ryūdō" (隆興). It is possible that he went by the name "Ryūsuke".

Following the Meiji Restoration, Saigō went to a government office to register his name. He intended to register orally under his given name (Ryūkō or Ryūdō). However, the civil servant misheard his name and he therefore became  under the law.  He did not particularly mind, so he never bothered to change it back. The name "Tsugumichi" arose as an alternate pronunciation for the characters of his name.

At the recommendation of Arimura Shunsai, he became a tea-serving Buddhist monk for the daimyō of Satsuma, Shimazu Nariakira. After he returned to secular life, he became one of a group of devoted followers of Arimura. As a Satsuma samurai, he participated in the Anglo-Satsuma War. He later joined the movement to overthrow the Tokugawa shogunate.

He was a commander of the Satsuma army fighting in the Battle of Toba–Fushimi as well as other battles on the imperial side of the Boshin War.

Imperial Japanese Army

In 1869, two years after the establishment of the Meiji government, Saigō went to Europe with General Yamagata Aritomo to study European military organizations, tactics and technologies. After his return to Japan, he was appointed a lieutenant-general in the new Imperial Japanese Army. He commanded Japanese expeditionary forces in the Taiwan Expedition of 1874.

In 1873, his brother Saigō Takamori resigned from the government, over the rejection of his proposal to invade Korea during the Seikanron debate. Many other officials from the Satsuma region followed suit, however, Saigō Jūdō continued to remain loyal to the Meiji government. Upon the death of his brother in the Satsuma Rebellion, Saigō Jūdō became the primary political leader from Satsuma. In accord with the kazoku peerage system enacted in 1884, he received the title of count (hakushaku).

Government official

Saigō held a string of important positions in the Itō Hirobumi cabinet, including Navy Minister (1885, 1892–1902).

As Minister of Internal Affairs, Saigō pushed strongly for the death penalty for Tsuda Sanzō, the accused in the Ōtsu incident of 1891, and threatened Kojima Korekata should the sentence be more lenient.

In 1892, he was appointed to the Privy Council as one of the genrō.

In 1894, Saigō was given the rank of admiral, in recognition of his role as Navy minister, and his peerage title was elevated to that of marquis.

In 1898, the Imperial Japanese Navy bestowed upon him the honorary title of Marshal-Admiral. The rank is equivalent to Admiral of the Fleet or Grand Admiral.

Personal life
Saigō’s former residence (once in Meguro, Tokyo) is registered as an Important Cultural Property by the Japanese government and is now at the Meiji-mura historical park outside of Inuyama, Aichi Prefecture. Saigō also owned a cottage in Yanagihara (present-day Numazu), Shizuoka Prefecture. Saigō Jūdō was the first person in Japan to own a race horse.
Gensui the Marquis Saigō died in 1902 and was buried in the Tama Cemetery in Fuchū in Tokyo.

Honours

National honours
:
Grand Cordon of the Order of the Chrysanthemum
Grand Cordon with Paulownia Flowers of the Order of the Rising Sun
Order of the Golden Kite, Second Class

Ancestry

Notes

References

 

 Much of the content of this article comes from the equivalent Japanese-language Wikipedia article :ja:西郷従道, retrieved April 6, 2006

External links

1843 births
1902 deaths
People from Satsuma Domain
Government ministers of Japan
Imperial Japanese Navy marshal admirals
Ministers of the Imperial Japanese Navy
Ministers of Home Affairs of Japan
Japanese generals
Kazoku
Members of the House of Peers (Japan)
People of the Boshin War
People of Meiji-period Japan
Samurai
Shimazu retainers
Japanese racehorse owners and breeders
Grand Cordons of the Order of the Rising Sun
Recipients of the Order of the Golden Kite
Deified Japanese people